Daniel Wimprine (born August 6, 1981) is a former American football quarterback.

College career
Wimprine was a four-year starter at quarterback for Memphis. He left the Tigers as the all-time leader in most major passing categories. Owns Tiger records for career completions (808), pass attempts (1,469), yards (10,215), touchdown passes (85), touchdowns responsible for (99) and interceptions (49). Tossed for over 300 yards eight times in his career, which still stands as the most 300-yard games in Tiger history. Had 22 games of 200 yards or more, also No. 1 in the Memphis record books. Started 42 of the 46 games that he played in, where he was 21-25 as a starter. Still remains in the Top 100 for most yards in NCAA History.  His first career start came against the University of Houston in 2001, where he defeated the Cougars 52-33. He finished that game by completing 14-of-21 passes for 216 yards and two touchdowns, while also carrying 15 times for 85 yards and a score. He went on to guide the Tigers to back-to-back eight win seasons as a junior and senior. Won the 2003 New Orleans Bowl, defeating the University of North Texas 27-17. Lost the 2004 GMAC Bowl to Bowling Green State University, 52-35. As a senior in 2004, was named All-Conference USA second-team, completing 199 of 359 passes for 2,568 yards and 18 TDs, while rushing for two more.

Professional career

Cleveland Browns
After the 2005 NFL Draft, the Cleveland Browns signed Wimprine to a one-year deal. He was able to go to camp with the Browns and compete for a spot behind Trent Dilfer, with Charlie Frye and Josh Harris.

Calgary Stampeders
Following his release by the Browns, Wimprine quickly signed with the Calgary Stampeders of the Canadian Football League. He completed 19 of 46 passes, for 270 yards, with two touchdowns and three interceptions.

New Orleans VooDoo
In 2008, Wimprined signed with the New Orleans VooDoo. He had not played organized football since 2005, and considered himself lucky to have an opportunity to play again. Wimprine went on to have tremendous success with the VooDoo in 2008, where he threw for 85 touchdowns, and only 11 interceptions. After the season, the AFL folded, and Wimprine went back to his life working the family business. In 2011, after the AFL was able to restructure itself, Wimprine once again signed up to be the quarterback for the VooDoo. After a decent return to the VooDoo, Wimprine retired in November after he and his wife Ashley Wimprine had their first child.

See also
 List of Division I FBS passing yardage leaders

References

External links
 Danny Wimprine VooDoo bio

1981 births
American football quarterbacks
American players of Canadian football
Calgary Stampeders players
Canadian football quarterbacks
Cleveland Browns players
living people
Memphis Tigers football players
New Orleans VooDoo players
Players of American football from New Orleans
Players of Canadian football from New Orleans
University of Memphis alumni